The Vendavel (alternate spellings include Vendevale and Vendaval) is a westerly wind that blows into the Mediterranean Sea around the area of the Straits of Gibraltar and Morocco. This is generally associated with travelling depressions entering the Mediterranean from the west.

See also
 Viento de Levante
 Sirocco

References

Winds